Braille is a system of writing for blind people.

Braille may also refer to:

Louis Braille, the Frenchman who devised the writing system
9969 Braille, an asteroid named for Louis Braille
Braille (musician) (born 1981), American hip-hop artist
 Braille (album)

See also
 Braille Patterns, a Unicode block
 Braille Scale, another name for 1/72 or 1/76 in modeling